National Secondary Route 217, or just Route 217 (or ) is a National Road Route of Costa Rica, located in the San José province.

Description
In San José province the route covers Desamparados canton (San Juan de Dios, San Rafael Abajo districts), Aserrí canton (Aserrí district), Alajuelita canton (San Josecito, San Antonio, Concepción districts).

References

Highways in Costa Rica